Dehmurd (also Romanized as Dehmūrd, Deh-e Mūrd, and Deh Moord; also known as Deh Mon) is a village in Bakhtegan Rural District, Abadeh Tashk District, Neyriz County, Fars Province, Iran. At the 2006 census, its population was 2,240, in 567 families.

References 

Populated places in Abadeh Tashk County